The Durham County Palatine Act 1858 (21 & 22 Vict c 45) is an Act of the Parliament of the United Kingdom.

Preamble
The preamble was repealed by section 9(2) of, and Part I of the Third Schedule to, the Crown Estate Act 1961.

Section 1 – Definition of the words "the county of Durham"
The section reads:

"The said recited Act"

This means the Durham (County Palatine) Act 1836 (6 & 7 Will 4 c 19) which was recited in the preamble. Section 7 of that Act contained a definition of the expression "County of Durham".

Section 2 – The interest of the bishoprick of Durham in the foreshores of the county of Durham vested in Her Majesty
This section now reads:

The words omitted were repealed by section 9(2) of and Part I of the Third Schedule to, the Crown Estate Act 1961.

Section 3 – Certain leases by the Bishop confirmed, but rents received under some of them to be apportioned
This section was repealed by section 9(2) of and Part I of the Third Schedule to, the Crown Estate Act 1961.

Section 4 – Rents and proceeds from the foreshores of Durham to be divided equally between the Crown and the Ecclesiastical Commissioners

The references to the Crown Estate Commissioners were substituted by virtue of article 2 of S.R. & O. 1924/1370, sections 1(1) and (7) of the Crown Estate Act 1956 and section 1(1) of, and paragraph 4(1) of the Second Schedule to, the Crown Estate Act 1961.

The words "in the manner prescribed by an Act passed in the Tenth Year of the Reign of His late Majesty King George the Fourth, chapter fifty" (which referred to the Crown Lands Act 1829) were repealed by section 9(2) of and Part I of the Third Schedule to, the Crown Estate Act 1961.

References to the Ecclesiastical Commissioners for England

The references to the Ecclesiastical Commissioners in this section must be construed as references to the Church Commissioners

Section 5 – Forfeitures and other Jura Regalia vested in Her Majesty in right of Her Crown
This section was repealed by section 9(2) of and Part I of the Third Schedule to, the Crown Estate Act 1961.

Section 6 – General saving
This section was repealed by section 9(2) of and Part I of the Third Schedule to, the Crown Estate Act 1961.

References
Halsbury's Statutes,

External links
The Durham County Palatine Act 1858, as amended from the National Archives.
The Durham County Palatine Act 1858, as originally enacted from the National Archives.

United Kingdom Acts of Parliament 1858
Acts of the Parliament of the United Kingdom concerning England
History of County Durham